is a Japanese voice actress affiliated with Aoni Production. She voiced roles in a bunch of titles in the 1990s including Pretty Sammy OVA and TV series, Moeyo Ken, Hell Teacher Nube, Princess Nine, and Sakura Diaries.  In video games, she provides the voice of Ena Arashizaki in Money Puzzle Exchanger, Yue Ying in the Dynasty Warriors / Warriors Orochi franchise, Alia in Mega Man, and Futaba Taiga in Sakura Wars New York.

Filmography

Anime

Film

Video games

References

External links
 Official agency profile 
 
 

1970 births
Living people
Voice actresses from Niigata Prefecture
Japanese video game actresses
Japanese voice actresses
20th-century Japanese actresses
21st-century Japanese actresses
Aoni Production voice actors